This is a list of the squads of the teams that participated in the 2015 Caribbean Premier League.

Barbados Tridents

Sources: CPLT20 official site and Cricinfo

Guyana Amazon Warriors

Sources: CPLT20 Official site and Cricinfo

Jamaica Tallawahs

Sources: CPLT20 Official site and Cricinfo

St Kitts and Nevis Patriots

Sources: CPLT20 Official site and Cricinfo

St Lucia Stars

Sources: CPLT20 Official site and Cricinfo

Trinbago Knight Riders

Sources: CPLT20 Official site and Cricinfo

Notes and references
Notes

References

External links

Caribbean Premier League